Biohazard 4 may refer to:

 Resident Evil 4, 2005 video game
 Resident Evil 4 (2023 video game), remake of the 2005 video game
 Resident Evil: Afterlife, the fourth live-action film in the Resident Evil series, released in 2010.
 Resident Evil: Death Island, the fourth CG film in the Resident Evil series, releasing in 2023
 Biohazard level 4, category to distinguish the severity of biological agents